The 2021–22 EHF European League was the 2nd edition of the EHF European League, the second most important European handball club competition organised by the European Handball Federation (EHF). 

Benfica became the first ever Portuguese team to win the trophy and the second non-German side to win the competition since 2004.

Qualifying rounds

First qualifying round
A total of 32 teams were involved in the first qualifying round. The first leg matches were held on 28–29 August 2021, while the second leg matches were held on 4–5 September 2021. The draw was held in EHF office in Vienna.

The results of this round were:

|}

Second qualifying round
A total of 24 teams were involved in the second qualifying round draw, 16 advancing from the previous round and 8 teams entering this round. The first leg matches were held on 20–21 September., while the second leg matches were held on 27–28 September.

The results of this round were:

|}

Group stage

Seedings
The 24 teams were divided into six pots of four teams, with a team from each pot being drawn to each group. Teams from the same country could not be drawn into the same group.

Tiebreakers
Teams were ranked according to points (2 points for a win, 1 point for a draw, 0 points for a loss), and if tied on points, the following tiebreaking criteria were applied, in the order given, to determine the rankings:
Points in matches among tied teams;
Goal difference in matches among tied teams;
Away goals scored in matches among tied teams;
Goal difference in all group matches;
Goals scored in all group matches;
If more than two teams were tied, and after applying all head-to-head criteria above, a subset of teams were still tied, all head-to-head criteria above were reapplied exclusively to this subset of teams;
Drawing lots.

Group A

Group B

Group C

Group D

Knockout stage
The pairings for the last 16 and the quarterfinals are based on group stage standings, according to the following bracket. This assures teams from the same group can only play each other again in the final four.

Last 16
The last 16 first legs were scheduled for 29 March 2022, while the second legs followed on 5 April 2022.

|}

Quarterfinals
The quarterfinals first legs were scheduled for 26 April 2022, while the second legs followed on 3 May 2022.

|}

Final four
The 2021–22 EHF European League Finals was played on 28 and 29 May 2022 in Lisbon, Portugal and comprise one leg semifinals, final and a third place game. The pairings for the semifinals were decided by drawing of lots.

Bracket

Semifinals

Third place game

Final

References

External links
 Official website

EHF Cup seasons
EHF European League
EHF European League
EHF European League
EHF European League